is a Japanese light novel series written by Chūgaku Akamatsu and illustrated by Kobuichi. As of June 2022, 37 main volumes have been published by Media Factory under their MF Bunko J label. A manga adaptation by Yoshino Koyoka started serialization in the seinen manga magazine Monthly Comic Alive in September 2009. An anime adaptation aired between April and June 2011. An original video animation (OVA) episode was released on December 21, 2011. A spin-off manga titled Aria the Scarlet Ammo AA by Shogako Tachibana was serialized in Square Enix's Young Gangan magazine from November 2010 to August 2018, with an anime adaptation by Doga Kobo airing between October and December 2015.

Plot
The Butei holders are trained in various specialized fields, and are permitted to possess various weapons and capture criminals. Kinji Tōyama is a student at Tokyo Butei High, a universal educational facility for the training of Butei. At this school, students with an aptitude for the work undertake special training in order to learn the path of the Butei. Shortly after Kinji decides to quit the Academy due to personal reasons, he is attacked by the Butei Killer, a criminal notorious for eliminating Butei—a case of the hunters becoming the hunted. The elite Butei Assault prodigy Aria H. Kanzaki comes to his rescue and from that moment on, Kinji's future as a Butei changes drastically.

The side story, Aria the Scarlet Ammo AA, follows Akari Mamiya, an E-ranked Butei who applies to become Aria's "Amica".

Characters

Main characters

A student at Butei High School. He was initially ranked E (lowest combat rank) due to missing the third term's final examination. However, when he is sexually aroused (such as sticking his face in a girl's chest, getting kissed or by him kissing a girl) he enters a state known as "Hysteria Mode" in which his cognitive and physical abilities increase to around thirty times his normal state, which allows him to perform feats of near-superhuman strength and skill, such as accurately shooting up the muzzle of an enemy gun, swinging his knife at supersonic speeds, and accurately shooting enemy bullets out of the air. Hysteria Mode is a genetic trait that all members of the Tōyama family possess, and is stated to be a highly evolved version of the natural male instinct to protect women. As such, when in Hysteria Mode, Kinji's major weakness is the fact that he cannot directly harm women, though he is still able to fight and restrain them without directly hurting them. In addition to this, Hysteria Mode also causes Kinji to develop a suave and seductive attitude towards women, which makes him very attractive to them while in Hysteria Mode. He is currently enrolled in the Inquesta department, though in the past, he was a prodigy (being rank S) of the Assault department, the most dangerous department in Butei High. Over the course of the series, Kinji grows to respect (and eventually develops romantic feelings for) Aria. He proves his feelings for Aria by kissing her on the lips in episode 5, though this is done to calm her down. Currently, his feelings for Aria are so strong that even the slightest bit of sexual/romantic involvement with Aria will instantly activate Hysteria Mode.
His gun of choice is a Beretta 92F (which has been illegally modified to fire a three-round burst; he refers to it as the Beretta Kinji Model). He also wields a butterfly knife. In Volume 6 of the light novel he obtains a black Desert Eagle (which has been modified to fire in bursts as well as auto) which belonged to his father and a double-edged seax (modified with a hidden sheath and a reinforced rubber handle) which belonged to Sherlock Holmes. When he activates Hysteria Mode, he is able to dual-wield both the Beretta and Desert Eagle as well as the Butterfly Knife and the Seax, making him earn the title of "Quadra of Mimicry" in the series.

A transfer student to the Butei High School in Japan. An "Assault" department elite rank S (the highest rank), she wishes to recruit Kinji into her team after their encounter. She has earned the title of "Quadra", meaning someone who can dual-wield both guns and swords. Her weapons of choice are two Colt Government Model M1911A1 semi-automatic pistols (one black and one silver) with custom hinge type triggers (as opposed to the traditional straight pull triggers of the M1911) and custom grips. She also uses two undersized Japanese swords known as kodachi. The "H" in her middle name stands for "Holmes" as she is a descendant of Sherlock Holmes himself, and her full name is Aria "Holmes" Kanzaki IV. She is very short for her age. Her stunted growth is due to a bullet embedded in her back made of a special material known as HihiIrokane. Irokane is a special element that can grant a normal human superpowers. HihiIrokane is red Irokane and in order to make use of its properties requires a childish nature and prideful personality. Although, Kinji has learned about the special properties of the bullet and the potential powers it gives her, Aria seems largely unaware of anything unusual about the bullet or herself. All she knows is that a stranger shot her for unknown reasons and that the bullet can't be removed safely. As a side effect of the HihiIrokane bullet lodged within her, Aria's eye and hair color (which were originally sapphire blue and flaxen blonde) changed to a deep ruby and pinkish strawberry blonde respectively. Her mother is Japanese and her father is half English, half Japanese. Her paternal grandmother is a member of the British Royal Family, having been knighted and received the title of a "dame". Aria develops feelings for Kinji after they kiss in episode 5, and gets jealous when other girls approach him.

A female student attending Butei High School and Kinji's childhood friend. She is enrolled in the special department known as SSR and her Butei rank is A. She's the current student council chairman, and president of various clubs including the gardening club, handicraft club, and girls' volleyball club. According to Kinji, she is a perfect Japanese beauty except for one flaw - jealousy, which turns her into a berserker who assaults any girl approaching Kinji. When she finds out that Aria is living with Kinji she tries to murder her. She is shown to love Kinji to the point that she will do anything for him. Kinji and Shirayuki kiss in episode 8, and since then Shirayuki's feelings for Kinji have increased to the point that she is willing to appear nude in front of him in order for him to notice her. She uses a Japanese sword named Irokane Ayame as her weapon of choice. It is later revealed that her name, Shirayuki, was an alias to conceal her real name, Himiko.

A female student at Butei High School and a friend of Kinji's. She is enrolled in the Inquesta department along with Kinji. Although often considered the biggest idiot in Kinji's class, this is a deliberate burikko facade which she drops when she is forced into dangerous circumstances. She has a talent for intelligence assessment and, at Butei High, gossip. She enjoys customizing her uniform in an Elegant Gothic Lolita style. She wields two Walther P99s and two knives and, much like Aria, has earned the title of "Quadra".
Near the end of the first volume, Riko reveals that she is a descendant of Arsène Lupin. Her real name is Riko Mine Lupin IV. Riko also reveals that she is the Butei Killer. She appears to have an inferiority complex towards the first Lupin and wants to exceed his legacy. The reason for this, and why she despises being referred to by her generation's number, is due to the circumstances under which she grew up. Orphaned at a young age, she was taken in by Vlad/Toru but kept locked in a cell with very little food and muddy water, and eventually was used as an experimental subject by Vlad/Toru. During this time he repeatedly told her that she's worthless (since she hadn't inherited any of the past Lupins' abilities) and that her only redeeming quality was that she could be used to produce another generation of the Lupin name, Lupin the V. Riko was eventually released from her captivity by Vlad/Toru and promised complete freedom provided that she was able to surpass the original Lupin. Her original plan was to recreate the historical encounter between the original Holmes and Lupin, with Aria and Kinji playing the roles of Sherlock and Watson. By defeating both of them she would surpass her ancestor since the original encounter ended in a draw. This plan fails, but Riko's able to convince them to aid her in recovering a memento from Vlad/Toru.
After helping Kinji and Aria defeat Vlad, Riko helps Aria by providing evidence that Vlad/Toru, and not her mother, Kanae Kanzaki, was truly behind all of the Butei Killer murders, and so reducing Kanae's sentence and delaying her impending execution. Riko appears to have feelings for Kinji, but these feelings may not be completely healthy because she constantly attempts to seduce Kinji - attempts which fail since Kinji is able to see through her machinations. She kisses Kinji after he points out that by defeating Vlad/Toru, she has surpassed her ancestor and can finally take pride in herself, perhaps sparking a more healthy interest in him. Riko and Aria have several characteristics in common: they are short, both have earned Quadra status, both wear their hair in twin-tails, both are the third generation scions of famous ancestors, and lastly, both are romantically interested in Kinji. Her surnames are derived from Arsène Lupin III and Fujiko Mine, and she is purportedly their child, although for copyright reasons, the identities of her parents are unknown.

The Snipe department's ace, Butei rank S. She has no family name and is habitually taciturn, impassive and indifferent to fashion. Kinji later finds out that this, along with her hair color, is due to the influence of large quantities of RiriIrokane in her birthplace. RiriIrokane is Azure Irokane and it bestows the ability to nullify other powers when the subject is calm. However, according to a Hotogi Historical Record it 'hates' human hearts and the princesses of the Ulus (to whom Reki belongs) revere RiriIrokane and offer their 'hearts' to it. She's always seen wearing Sennheiser PMX990 headphones through which she apparently listens to the sound of wind from her homeland (somewhere between Northern Mongolia and Siberia). Her signature quotation is "I am a single bullet. It has no heart. Therefore, it does not think. It just flies straight towards its target", which she always say before she takes a shot. Her sniper skills are so high that she can shoot anything within a 2 km radius without missing her target. Her personal weapon is a SVD (Dragunov Sniper-Rifle) with an attachable bayonet.
In the middle of volume 3, Reki tames a wolf in a matter of 5 minutes, which she later names Haimaki, and trains to be a Butei dog. From then on, she lives together with Haimaki in her room in a girls' dormitory. Kinji has visited her room at least twice up to volume 6 of light novel and has noted how bare and simple it is. Reki also sleeps upright with the Dragunov in her hands, perhaps to prevent an ambush attack according to Kinji. On noting that Reki doesn't possess any clothing other than a number of school uniforms, and as a part of his Lima syndrome plan, Kinji buys her a casual outfit as a present. Reki cleans up nicely; in fact, Kinji was left speechless after witnessing her dressed-up appearance in volume 6.
She plays a minor role in the series, usually providing covering fire for Aria and Kinji when they are fighting at close range or saving them during times of trouble. At the end of volume 5, she holds Kinji at gunpoint on the rooftop of Butei High, kisses him and proposes marriage to him. She also reveals that she already knows about the I-U and Hysteria Mode. Her ancestors are revealed to be Minamoto no Yoshitsune and Genghis Khan. The Ulu tribe she belongs to only gives birth to girls (possibly due to a genetic flaw from being so insular.) Since there are only 47 members of the tribe (counting Reki) there seems to be no need to provide a second name. Her tribe practices a kind of reverse bride kidnapping as their courtship ritual, where the 'bride' kidnaps the 'groom'. Reki pursued Kinji and shot the buttons off of his jacket (without hurting him) at intervals until he 'surrendered' himself to her. As an attempt to 'break up' with her, he tried to get her to undergo Lima syndrome (where a kidnapper falls for victim), but was not completely successful in preventing himself from undergoing Stockholm syndrome (where the victim sympathizes with the kidnapper.) It is hinted that selecting Kinji as her 'husband' was to provide, not only herself, but possibly the 46 other princesses of the Ulus, with strong children as well. Realizing that Reki would likely try to shoot herself as a result of her kidnapping him, Kinji sabotaged her last bullet. After this, Reki started living for herself and her friends (mainly Kinji) in contrast to her earlier habit of living solely for duty and obsessively obeying the 'voice of the wind'.
Apparently, before coming to Butei High, Reki performed "unrecorded" jobs in Russia and China due to her Butei license. In other words, she worked as a "Sweeper".

Jeanne d'Arc XXX (also known as Durandal or Diamond Dust Witch) is an ice ability user from I-U (a criminal organization). During the events in Volume 2 of the light novel, she targets Shirayuki in an attempt to kidnap her and force her to join I-U. She is successfully captured via the combined efforts of Aria, Kinji and Shirayuki during the season of Adseard. As one of the conditions of her plea bargain, she was forced to stay in Butei High as a 2nd year international student from Paris enrolled in the Informa department. As a reliable Informa student, Kinji requests her aid whenever he needs knowledge about a particular case he is involved in. Jeanne and Riko get along with each other very well.
She is one of the few people who knows of Kinji's secret. Her personality is serious and cool. Her first comment about Butei High's uniform skirt is:"Unmarried girls shouldn't openly reveal their legs like this!". However, that notion is pretty much shattered because of Riko's strong influence on her, and she has developed a habit of secretly collecting maid dresses, lolita fashion, and other cute dresses. Due to astigmatism she usually wears contacts to see clearly, but carries a pair of glasses as backup or for reading.
Although Jeanne is quite extraordinary in terms of her beauty, fighting skills, as well as her planning and investigating abilities, her drawing skills are unimpressive:an elementary school student can draw much better than she can. Despite her strength, she alleges that she is the weakest out of all the members of I-U. Her preferred weapon is the Durandal. However, after Shirayuki broke part of it off she had to adjust to the shorter blade. Melting down the whole blade and reforging it as a single piece again was inadvisable as that would severely weaken the integrity of the metal, making it much easier to break. Or in simpler terms, the weakness of the break would be spread to the entire sword.

Aria the Scarlet Ammo AA characters

A female student attending Butei High School in the Assault department who greatly admires Aria that borders on obsessiveness. Akari is typically clumsy and carefree but is known to be protective of her friends. She and her younger sister Nonoka are two of the few survivors of the Mamiya clan, a clan of assassins that operated during the days of the shogunate and specialized instant-kill techniques. In modern Japan however, their techniques and unique poisons are no longer used and are only passed down in order to preserve them but their estate was destroyed, Nonoka was poisoned and their mother Misuzu was presumably killed by Kyouchikytou and the organization IU before the events of the story. Akari joined Butei High School because she wanted to protect and save others instead of killing which is one of the reasons she greatly admires Aria and also why she refuses to use her gun on criminals. However, she is still capable of using her family's techniques if she is forced or if the situation requires it. Despite her background and experiences, Akari is clumsy but cheerful, optimistic and friendly which gains her new friends and even admirers. She uses a Colt M1911 like Aria who takes it from her as part of the Amica test wherein Akari must take to steal it back. She also possesses a 25-round Micro Uzi and tactical knife. She eventually succeeds and becomes Aria's official Amica. She is known to greatly dislike Kinji due to his closeness to Aria and because he admitted to finding her annoying.

A female student attending Butei High School in the Inquesta department who comes from the wealthy and prestigious Sasaki family and is descended from Sasaki Kojirō. Like her ancestor she is a practitioner of the Ganryū sword style and can even use Kojirō's famous Swallow Cut technique. She first met Akari at a food stand where they share a leaf pie. She has since developed an obsessive crush on Akari to the point that she is willing to resort to violence in order to make Akari break off her amica relationship with Aria who she is extremely jealous of. She is also known to stalk Akari and take candid pictures of her changing or in a swimsuit. She later becomes Shirayuki Hotogi's amica after Shino passes her test and Shirayuki senses her strong feelings. Ironically, the two share similar traits:both have the appearance and grace of a yamato nadeshiko but their appearances belie their great skills as swordswomen, their mutual dislike and jealousy of Aria, they both come from influential families, they both harbor strong feelings for someone and they both have yandere-like tendencies. Shino prefers to use a standard katana in battle but she also possesses an ōdachi called the Monohoshizao like her ancestor's.

A female student attending Butei High School who has known Akari since middle school. Tall, highly athletic and skilled in battle yet somewhat tomboyish, Raika is greatly admired by both men and women alike especially by her amica Kirin Shima although some boys insult her tomboyish behavior which she takes to heart. Despite this, Raika secretly loves cute and feminine things such as stuffed toys and dresses, a secret that is later discovered by Kirin and Akari. Raika favors close quarters combat in battle.

A female student attending Butei Middle School in the CVR department's Division 2 who admires Raika and applies to become her amica. Despite Raika's initial refusal she eventually accepts Kirin. She was previously the amica of Riko Mine but after the 1 year amica period expired, Kirin searched for a new partner and found the qualities she desired in Raika. Like Riko, Kirin also customized her uniform into a Gothic Lolita style which, aside from being her preference and being used to tease and tempt Raika, is used to conceal weapons. Kirin possesses a childish personality and appearance, even more so than Riko, but this belies her crafty and manipulative side which is common among students of the CVR division. Kirin is adept at hand to hand combat.

A female student attending Butei High School in the Assault department. She is the proud heiress of the Takachiho Family, a household of armed lawyers. Her father and Shino Sasaki's father are said to be enemies in court. She appears very dignified, and is always seen with Yuyu and Yaya, a pair of twins that are her servants. Her wealth and status fuel her confidence level quite high, and she uses it to obtain many things that she wishes for. She likes being in control of situations and people. Despite her acting high and mighty, deep down, she cares and means well for the ones she cares about. In the anime, she is initially shown to look down on Akari and is jealous of her due to her succeeding in becoming Aria's amica while Urara herself failed though the matter with Aria is not present in the manga. She later befriends Akari and develops a rivalry with Shino over Akari's friendship. In the anime, she uses a Ruger Super Redhawk with an extended barrel and a rifle stock and a rapier.

A female student attending Butei High School in the Assault department. Always by her side with her twin sister, Yuyu Aizawa, they follow Urara Takachiho as her sidekick servants. She wears a white single-sided headphone-like headband with her hiragana character 'や' on the earpod. She uses an Ingram Model 11.

A female student attending Butei High School in the Assault department. Always by her side with her twin sister, Yaya Aizawa, they follow Urara Takachiho as her sidekick servants. Like Yaya, she wears a white single-sided headphone-like headband but with her hiragana character 'ゆ' on the earpod. She uses an Ingram Model 10.

A female member of the organization IU. Along with Jeanne d'Arc, she was smuggled into Tokyo Butei High School with Mine Riko's help. Much like Riko, she has a rather short stature and often dresses in Gothic Lolita fashion. Kyou is very reserved and quiet. She is a genius tactician and knows how to cover her tracks. In one instance she sent an entire work complex crumbling down on Akari and her friends with a very intricate Rube Goldberg machine that, in the end, could only be ruled as a freak accident due to the nature of the sabotage. She and the other members of IU attacked the Mamiya clan's estate during which she poisoned Akari's younger sister Nonoka which would ultimately cause her to lose her vision two years before the beginning of the story. She later reappears and offers Akari the antidote to Nonoka's poison in exchange for the Mamiya clan's secret technique the Takamakuri which she believes is a unique poison. She is eventually defeated and captured by Aria and Akari. Her preferred weapon is poison which she claims to possess 83 different kinds. She also uses wires and an M134 Minigun. In the anime, she has an older sister named Suimitsutou.

She is Akari's younger sister and a middle school Student and one of the few non-antagonistic characters who do not attend Butei High School. Unlike Akari, Nonoka is mature for her age; she does the housework and wakes Akari up every morning. Like Akari, she is also the object of Shino Sasaki's crush. Two years before the events of the story, her family's estate was attacked and destroyed by IU and she herself was poisoned by Kyouchikytou which would cause her to slowly lose her eyesight. Her condition worsens during the events of the story but she is eventually cured by Akari who defeats Kyouchikytou with Aria's help.

Tokyo Butei High

Students

Kinji's underclassman. A Lezzad freshman, enrolled in class 1-C, she has her black hair usually pony-tailed in the back. She also wears a long muffler around the neck, a Fundoshi for underwear, and appears in traditional ninja garb. She is rumored to be a descendant of a famous ninja lineage (presumably decedents of Fūma Kotarō).
When they were in middle school together, she and Kinji sparred. At that time, Kinji happened to be in Hysteria Mode and he subdued Fuuma like a child. Ever since then, she greatly respects Kinji and calls him "Master". She works part-time in order to pay for her tuition as well as to make ends meet, which she refers to as "training". She is Kinji's Amica, which is when a Junior (Kinji) or Senior acts like a big brother/sister for a freshman (Fuuma) and essentially shows them the ropes about various things whether it is skills, state of mind for situations, training methods, nuggets of experience, etc.

The Logi's ace with a 190 cm height and pointy hair. Kinji considers him as a transportation geek. This is due to his extensive knowledge of various vehicles whether it be on land, sea or air. He is a skilled driver who can operate anything from a car to a nuclear submarine. His personal weapon is a Colt Python Revolver that uses .357 magnum bullets which he chose solely for ease of maintenance, as despite the astounding firepower, the gun's loading capacity is small, the accuracy is horrible and it cannot equip a suppressor, so normally, no Butei would use it. Goki has feelings for Shirayuki. He is also a shameless pervert.

A bright, handsome and popular guy. Enrolled in Assault, and in the same class as Kinji, his Butei level is A. Even though there are different aspects involved in an A ranking, his integration capacity is high; his barehanded, dagger handling or shooting aspects can all be relied upon. The reliability of his gun is very high, a Mk. 23 MOD 0 with an installed laser aiming lens. He is also a rare polite person in Butei High. Even though he is very popular with girls, he never had a girlfriend before. He is Kinji and Muto's close friend. In past, during Kinji's days in Assault, they were often teammates. Kinji considers him a good friend and someone to rely on; an example of a polite and elegant student.

A genius of the Amdo department, she is enlisted by other students to upgrade or modify their weapons although, according to Kinji, her labor fees are considerably expensive. Kinji's Beretta pistol is one such example. Despite being a genius in customizing weapons, sometimes, due to sloppy work, the guns she has worked on malfunction, as seen when Kinji's Beretta, modified to fire three-round bursts, stops working and instead fires 2 bullets almost at the same time. Her ancestor is Hiraga Gennai.
Kinji has stated that considering her skills, she should be ranked S. However, due to the massive fees she charges for her services, coupled with the large number of illegal modifications she performs, she is A-ranked. Her appearance is that of a child, her hair is length is below the ear, and she is widely known in Butei High for watching anime as she tinkers through Butei guns and weapons.

A second year student from Connect, she specializes in providing real-time intelligence to Buteis that are operating in the field. Her instructions are always crystal clear, and Kinji claims that she has a voice worthy of a NHK news broadcaster. She also possess an incredible sense of hearing and is able to deduce the location of the sound of wind which Reki always listens to through hearing alone. However, she is shown to be extremely timid when she is off-duty and has trouble interacting with people without the use of some kind of communication device, which is probably why she is ranked B despite her talents. She became friends with Jeanne when she was forced to transfer to Butei High and shared a dormitory apartment with her.

Teachers

Homeroom teacher for Class 2-A and the head of department for Inquesta. Described as a "Butei High's kind teacher", she seems to be one of the few non-violent teachers depicted in the series, but she has actually a past as a vicious mercenary nicknamed "Bloody Yutori".

Homeroom teacher for Class 2-B and head of department for Dagula. An expert in interrogation techniques, she is capable of extracting confessions from the toughest offenders. She is apparently one of the top five interrogators in Japan. She has a habit of smoking hand-rolled cigarettes, even in the vicinity of students. Wields a Glock 18.

An Assault department instructor, she is known to be a very violent teacher, earning her the nickname of "Human Bunker Buster". Her catchphrases are "Go die!" or "Death!". Rumored to be connected with the Hong Kong triads. She was the teacher that took the group photograph for Team Baskerville during their formation ceremony in volume 7 of the light novels.

A geneticist who works as a part-time instructor for the Ambulance department, he is a university graduate from abroad and is noted to be very handsome with an appearance of a 20-year-old. He is very polite, using honorific speech at all times, which contributed to his immense popularity in Butei High. It turns out he was the one who had captured and imprisoned Riko after her parents died. He was seeking Lupin's superior genetic material to add to his collection (possibly himself as well,) but, as it seemed she was severely lacking in talent and ability, he treated her as a worthless failure. This entailed abuse, long stretches of being locked in a cell covered in dirt with nothing to do but sit, and constant comments on how she was a failure while she was still dealing with her parents' deaths.
In truth, this identity is an outer shell that Vlad created from the genetic material (DNA) that Vlad had absorbed through centuries of drinking blood. This is similar to an insect's memesis where not only does an 'invader' look like the species its invading, but also 'acts' like a member of the species. Toru can summon Vlad, who takes the form of a large wolf-like creature, but only when Sayonaki feels an extreme emotion. Vlad is otherwise dormant while the split personality, Sayonaki, retains control and handles the day-to-day matters. Due to his centuries of experiences Sayonaki is no longer able to get emotionally stimulated enough to summon Vlad by normal means. However, by somehow imprinting himself with a version of Kinichi Tohyama's Hysteria Savant Syndrome he's able to use it to awaken Vlad. The difference is that Sayonaki's version isn't triggered by arousal, like Kinji's, but by the sadistic pleasure he derives from abusing 'lesser species.' Being a proud and ancient vampire this means anything weaker than a vampire is considered a lesser species with humanity holding the position of 'weak prey.' Thus, he and Vlad are able to abuse cute girls, like Riko, without Hysteria mode hindering them because their protective instinct (assuming they have any) would only apply to cute, female vampires, not humans. Vlad tells Kinji that this is similar to how he (Kinji) wouldn't be able to enter Hysteria mode if he saw a female Chimpanzee being abused. Vlad has also somehow modified his howl to interrupt Kinji's Hysteria mode. 
Vlad has the ability to quickly heal his own wounds and proved to be a difficult opponent for Riko, Aria and Kinji. However, Vlad was finally captured by the trio when all 4 of his weak points (marked by eye-shaped symbols from a Vatican Paladin's spell) were shot at the same time causing crippling damage. However, the fact that both Vlad and Sayonaki share the same body was kept secret. This may be due to conditions of the plea bargain that Kinji and Aria had to agree to lest they go to jail for larceny (although considering they were 'recovering' stolen property for the rightful owner [Riko], this is more likely the government's overreaction over any information dealing with I-U.)

Others

Head of the illegal Yakuza group, Kagataka. Due to her father's death she inherited the head of the group. She was Kinji's friend when he was studying in Kanagawa Butei Junior High and among the few who knew about Kinji's Hysteria Mode and used it to make Kinji her slave and which is why Kinji disliked women. After the group disbanded, she enrolled into Tokyo Butei High and a member of both Lezzad and Daugula department.

Class representative of Higashi Ikebukuro High School and friend of Kinji when he was forced to transfer school with Reki. At volume 13 She messaged Kinji that she considered being a Butei and enrolled into Tokyo Butei High and a member of Ambulace department.

The inheritance of genes from their father, Konza Tohyama, which consist of Kinji, Kinichi, Kinzo, and Kaname.
Kinichi Tohyama
Brother of Kinji and a member of the criminal organization 'I.U'. Like Kinji, he possesses the Tohyama genetic trait of Hysteria Mode, although his term for it is H.S.S. Is able to sustain Hysteria mode for over a day at a time, but due to the immense stress on the body has to sleep for days. To self-trigger Hysteria Mode Kinichi crossdresses as an ideal beauty while going by the name Kana. Kana is Kinichi's version of Kinji's personality shift when going into Hysteria Mode. Like Kinji, Kinichi knows and remembers everything Kana does and vice versa. Also, like Kinji Kinichi gets extremely embarrassed about his actions in Hysteria Mode when switched back to normal mode. Six months prior to the first chapter of "Aria the Scarlet Ammo" Kinichi saved everybody on a cruise ship before disappearing as the latest victim of the Butei Killer. He never contacted Kinji during that time until Riko arranges a meeting after the confrontation with Vlad. As a result of Kinichi's disappearing, the mass of hate mail blaming Kinichi for the ship incident, and Kana asking Kinji for help killing Aria upon meeting again (breaking Article 1 of the Butei Code which Kinichi had strictly adhered to in the past,) has destroyed all of Kinji's interest in being a Butei causing him to wish for a normal life and considering Hysteria Mode a curse. Currently Kinichi seems to be in a relationship with Patra, but declared himself unaffiliated rather than siding with Deen or Grenada during the Bandire much to Patra's disappointment.
Kaname Tohyama
Sister of Kinji. During the questioning on the bus she mentions that she has Caucasian mixed in her lineage, but other than that hasn't explained her parentage other than being Kinji's sister. In the facility she was raised in as a super soldier she was only referred to by her serial number G-IV (Generation four.) She never had a name until Kinji gave her the name Kaname which is Kana plus the Japanese character for girl. Is obsessive over Kinji and wants all his affection for herself resulting in extreme jealous outbursts whenever another girl gets close to him. Such as carving "traitor" into concrete with her fingers when she spies him with Watson dressed up as a girl. Due to extreme training at the facility she is able to shrug off the pain from being her bulletproof clothing being shot with a magnum. (Bulletproof clothing prevents the bullet from penetrating, but the force of the bullet is turned into severe blunt force trauma which really hurts.) Weapon of choice is mono-filament vibrosword called Sonic. (Ie the edge is one molecule thick allowing it to cut everything and the whole sword vibrates.)
Kinzo Tohyama
Brother of Kinji.

Media

Light novels
Aria the Scarlet Ammo is a light novel series written by Chūgaku Akamatsu, with illustrations by Kobuichi. Media Factory published the first novel on August 25, 2008 under their MF Bunko J imprint. As of June 2022, 37 main novels have been released. A spin-off novel, Aria the Scarlet Ammo Reloaded, was published on December 25, 2012. A light novel adaptation of Aria the Scarlet Ammo AA was published in four volumes in 2015. The first two novels were published in English digitally by Digital Manga in 2013 and 2014.

Manga
A manga adaptation, illustrated by Yoshino Koyoka, began serialization in the November 2009 issue of Media Factory's Monthly Comic Alive sold on September 26, 2009. The first tankōbon volume was published on April 23, 2010; 25 volumes have been released as of February 2022. The first three manga volumes were published in English digitally by Digital Manga in 2014. A spin-off manga titled  by Shogako Tachibana was serialized in Square Enix's Young Gangan magazine between November 5, 2010 and August 23, 2018. The first tankōbon volume was published on March 23, 2011. Fourteen volumes total were released.

Anime

A 12-episode anime television series adaptation, directed by Takashi Watanabe and produced by J.C.Staff, aired in Japan between April 15 and July 1, 2011. An original video animation episode was released on December 21, 2011. The anime is licensed in North America by Funimation, in Australia by Madman Entertainment, and in the United Kingdom by Manga Entertainment. The anime made its North American television debut on the Funimation Channel on November 27, 2012.

An anime adaptation of Aria the Scarlet Ammo AA, a spin-off manga series written by Shogako Tachibana and produced by Doga Kobo aired in Japan between October 6 and December 22, 2015. The series is also licensed in North America by Funimation, who simulcasted the series as it aired.

Reception
The Aria the Scarlet Ammo light novels have sold over 5 million copies as of April 2014.

References

External links
 Light novel official website 
 Anime official website 
 Aria the Scarlet Ammo at Funimation

2008 Japanese novels
2009 manga
2011 anime OVAs
2011 anime television series debuts
Anime and manga based on light novels
Digital Manga Publishing titles
Doga Kobo
Funimation
J.C.Staff
Japanese LGBT-related animated television series
Light novels
Gangan Comics manga
Girls with guns anime and manga
Madman Entertainment anime
Media Factory manga
MF Bunko J
Kadokawa Dwango franchises
Romantic comedy anime and manga
Seinen manga
Sharp Point Press titles
Television shows based on light novels
Tokyo in fiction